Ingebrigt Håker Flaten (born 1971 in Oppdal, Norway) is a Norwegian bass player active in the jazz and free jazz genres.

He has released one solo album, and two albums with his quintet, Ingebrigt Håker Flaten Quintet. Flaten is also active in a long list of other ensembles, such as Atomic, The Thing, Scorch Trio and Free Fall.

Solo

Ingebrigt Håker Flaten Quintet

Ingebrigt Håker Flaten, Håkon Kornstad, Jon Christensen

Other ensembles

Aaly Trio/DKV trio

Atle Nymo / Ingebrigt Håker Flaten / Håkon Mjåset Johansen

Atomic

Atomic/School Days

Bugge Wesseltoft's New Conceptions Of Jazz

Circulasione Totale Orchestra

Close Erase

Crimetime Orchestra

Daniel Levin Trio

Eivind Aarseth

The Electrics

Element

Evan Parker / Ingebrigt Håker Flaten

Fredrik Nordström Quintet

Free Fall

Ingebrigt Håker Flaten / Håkon Kornstad

Ingoma

IPA

Jazzmob

Mazzarella / Häker Flaten / Ra

Michiyo Yagi, Ingebrigt Håker Flaten & Paal Nilssen-Love

No spagetti edition

Ole Henrik Giørts / Lars Saabye Christensen

Petter Wettre Trio / The Trio

(((Powerhouse Sound)))

San

School Days

Scorch Trio

Sigurd Køhn Quartet

The Source

Stephen Gauci's Basso Continuo

The Thing

See also The Music of Norman Howard, an album by School Days and The Thing.

Two Bands and a Legend

Townhouse Orchestra

Trinity

Williams / Håker Flaten / Daisy

Zim Ngqawana

Compilations

Other appearances

Friko

Mungolian Jet Set

The Samuel Jackson Five

Susanna

See also
Paal Nilssen-Love discography
Rune Grammofon discography

References

General

 
 

 

 

Specific

External links
Official website

Jazz discographies
Discographies of Norwegian artists